Adam Reid is an American writer and film director and co-founder of Bodega Studios. His film Hello Lonesome won numerous film festival awards as well as a Film Independent Spirit Award nomination. He is also the author of the book The Adventures of Barry & Joe.

Career

Reid got his start in the film industry with producing promotional videos for Comedy Central. is the co-founder of the production company and agency Bodega Studios where he has made commercials for brands such as M&M's and Lean Cuisine.

Reid's major directorial debut was Hello Lonesome, an indie film that he also wrote and produced. The film was shot on a budget of $50,000 and completed in 15 days. It won numerous awards including at the Los Angeles Film Festival and the Bahamas International Film Festival. Hello Lonesome was also nominated for a Film Independent Spirit Award.

Reid is also the creator of Barry & Joe, an animated series concept, featuring cartoon versions of Barack Obama and Joe Biden who travel through time. The concept was conceived the day after the 2016 United States presidential election, but Reid did not immediately pursue it thinking it was a "stoner idea." Reid launched a Kickstarter campaign to fund the project in August 2017, raising more than $100,000. Conan O'Brien has signed on to be one of the producers of the series.

Reid is also the author of The Adventures of Barry & Joe, a graphic novel based on the same concept as the animated series.

Filmography

Film

Other projects

References

External links
 Adam Reid official website
 Bodega Studios official website
 https://m.imdb.com/name/nm1027261

Year of birth missing (living people)
Living people
American film directors
Place of birth missing (living people)